"I Said Hi" is a song recorded by Australian singer-songwriter Amy Shark. It was released on 13 April 2018 as the lead single from her studio album Love Monster (July 2018). At the ARIA Music Awards of 2018, Dann Hume and M-Phazes won Producer of the Year for their work on "I Said Hi". At the APRA Music Awards of 2019, it won Pop Work of the Year and Song of the Year. For the ceremony, Electric Fields performed their cover version of "I Said Hi". On the ARIA Singles Chart, it peaked at No. 6. By the end of 2020 it was certified 5× platinum for shipment of over 350000 copies.

Background 

Amy Shark says "I Said Hi" was inspired by her retort to managers when they told her whom she was meeting to discuss her future: the same people who had knocked back her emails and calls. Shark told MusicFeeds: "It's an anthem for anyone who is waking up everyday fighting for what they believe in and challenging the universe!"

At the ARIA Music Awards of 2018, "I Said Hi" was nominated for four awards; with Dann Hume and M-Phazes winning the Producer of the Year for "I Said Hi". At the APRA Music Awards of 2019, the song won Pop Work of the Year and Song of the Year. At the event, Electric Fields performed the song. At the Queensland Music Awards 2019 "I Said Hi" won Highest Selling Single.

Music video

The music video, filmed in Melbourne, was directed by Nick Waterman and co-directed by Amy Shark and released on 8 May 2018.

Charts

Weekly charts

Year-end charts

Certifications

Release history

References

 

2018 singles
2018 songs
Amy Shark songs
Sony Music Australia singles
ARIA Award-winning songs
APRA Award winners
Songs written by Amy Shark
Song recordings produced by Dann Hume